Arvind Swamy (born 18 June 1970) is an Indian actor, director, model, entrepreneur and television presenter known for his work in Tamil cinema and a few Hindi, Telugu and Malayalam films. He was introduced as an actor by Mani Ratnam with the blockbuster film Thalapathi (1991) and subsequently starred in successful films such as Roja (1992), Bombay (1995), Minsara Kanavu (1997), Thani Oruvan (2015), and Chekka Chivantha Vaanam (2018). He made his debut as a director in the Netflix anthology series Navarasa (2021) in which his segment named Project Agni (Adbhutha – Wonder).

Swamy also starred in other regional film industries, including Telugu and Malayalam films where he has done films such as Mounam (1995), Daddy (1992) and Devaraagam (1996). He has also appeared in Bollywood, making his appearance in Saat Rang Ke Sapne (1998). He briefly worked as a television presenter as the host of the third season of Neengalum Vellalam Oru Kodi (2012–2016) on Star Vijay.

Early life
Swamy's parents are industrialist V. D. Swamy and Bharatanatyam dancer Vasantha. Swamy studied at the Sishya School and later in Don Bosco Matriculation Higher Secondary School, P. S. Senior Secondary School and completed his schooling in 1987. He then graduated from Loyola College, Madras in 1990 with a Bachelor of Commerce degree. He then went to the United States to do his master's degree in international business from Wake Forest University in North Carolina. 

Arvind Swamy wished to be a doctor. In college, he used to be a model for pocket money. In his Loyola Theatre Society, he wasn't well received and was asked to get off stage. Later on Mani Ratnam saw him in an advertisement and called for a meeting. Then he and Santosh Sivan introduced him to the basics of film-making.

Career

1991–2000: Early career and breakthrough
Arvind Swamy made his debut in Mani Ratnam's action drama film, Thalapathi (1991), where he played a young district collector pitted against a don and his own biological brother. Subsequently, Mani Ratnam signed him on to play the lead role in the 1992 political drama film Roja (1992). Roja and Bombay (1995) won awards at the State and National Film Award functions. His performance in Bombay was called "soulful" by Time magazine. Swamy has won several awards, popular and critical, for his films. He has been described as one of the first few actors in India who is able to achieve pan-Indian appeal. He lends his voice for the Tamil dubbing version for the adult Simba of Disney's The Lion King (1994). His next project was Indira (1995), followed by Telugu Mounam (1995) and Malayalam movie Devaraagam (1996).

He starred in Rajiv Menon's Minsara Kanavu alongside Kajol and Prabhu Deva, which won four National Film Awards and high box office numbers. The film eventually performed well at the box office after a slow start, with Arvind Swamy eventually stating he was happy to be a part of the film. His next film was Pudhayal (1997).  He appeared in his first straight Hindi film through Priyadarshan's Saat Rang Ke Sapne (1998) produced by Amitabh Bachchan. Co-starring alongside Juhi Chawla, Arvind portrayed the role of a village do-gooder. His final two releases before his sabbatical, En Swasa Kaatre (1999) and Raja Ko Rani Se Pyar Ho Gaya (2000).

2000–2005: Business career 
Swamy eventually stopped acting in films post-2000, after playing a guest role in Mani Ratnam's Alaipayuthey, and opted to concentrate on his business interests. In 2000, he became the president of InterPro Global, and the chairman and managing director of Prolease India, engaged in transaction processing. He was in charge of operations and technology for the delivery of many processes across different verticals globally. He then founded Talent Maximus in 2005, a company engaged in payroll processing and temporary staffing in India.

In 2005, he had an accident and injured his spine. He experienced partial paralysis of his leg and suffered in pain for many years. The treatment took another 4–5 years.

2013–present: Back to films
After his successful treatment, Mani Ratnam called him once more to play a role in one of his films, Kadal (2013) for which Swamy dropped 15 kilograms. In 2013, he provided the voice-over for Santhosh Sivan's film Ceylon.

In 2015, he plays an iconic negative role of Sidharth Abhimanyu in Thani Oruvan, for which he was highly praised and received positive reviews and many awards for his acting.

In 2016, he reprised the same role in Telugu in the film Dhruva with Ram Charan, a remake of Thani Oruvan, for which he got a lot of appreciation from the Telugu audience. Later the same year, he appeared in a Hindi movie, Dear Dad. The game show Neengalum Vellalam Oru Kodi recruited Swamy for its third season, which started airing on 30 May 2016.

In 2017, he did the title role of Bogan, co starring Jayam Ravi, for which he again got an outstanding response from the critics and the audience.

In 2018, he acted in Bhaskar Oru Rascal. Arvind Swamy does a neat job without imitating what Mammootty did in the original. The film is followed by Chekka Chivantha Vaanam (2018). The film was released to positive reviews which also got him the Filmfare Award.

In 2021, he acted in A. L. Vijay's directorial biographical-political drama Thalaivii opposite Kangana Ranaut. He portrayed the character of actor-politician M. G. Ramachandran in the film. Arvind Swami returns to Malayalam cinema after 25 years with Ottu (2022).

Personal life 
Swamy married Gayathri Ramamurthy in June 1994 and has one daughter Adhira, born in 1996, and a son Rudra, born in 2000. The couple lived separately for seven years until 2010, when they filed for divorce. He was granted the custody of his children. He married Aparna Mukerjee in 2012.

Filmography

As an actor

Films

Web series and short films

Television

As a narrator

As a dubbing artist

As a playback singer 
 Udal Manukku - Iruvar
 Unnodu Naan Irundha - Iruvar
 Kooduvittu Koodu - Bogan

References

External links
 

Tamil male actors
Indian male film actors
Indian male voice actors
Living people
Tamil businesspeople
Male actors from Chennai
Wake Forest University alumni
Indian television presenters
Don Bosco schools alumni
Loyola College, Chennai alumni
Who Wants to Be a Millionaire?
1970 births